Seh Ran Bala (also Romanized as Seh Rān Bālā; also known as Sarān-e Bālā, Sarān-e ‘Olyā, and Serān) is a village in Mahru Rural District, Zaz va Mahru District, Aligudarz County, Lorestan Province, Iran. At the 2006 census, its population was 35, in 5 families.

References 

Towns and villages in Aligudarz County